The 1948 WANFL season was the 64th season of senior football in Perth, Western Australia.

Ladder

Grand final

References

West Australian Football League seasons
WANFL